Bishops Waltham railway station was a railway station in Bishop's Waltham, Hampshire, England. The station was the terminus  of the 3.75 mile branch line that connected  to the main line at Botley railway station. It opened on 1 June 1863, and closed to passengers on 2 January 1933. After closure to freight in 1962 it was demolished in 1965 and the site is now a roundabout.

See also 

List of closed railway stations in Britain
Bishops Waltham branch

References

External links
 Bishops Waltham at Disused stations

Buildings and structures demolished in 1965
Disused railway stations in Hampshire
Former London and South Western Railway stations
Railway stations in Great Britain opened in 1863
Railway stations in Great Britain closed in 1933
Bishop's Waltham